Witten is a surname. Notable people with the surname include:

 Louis Witten, American theoretical physicist and father of both Edward and Matt Witten
 Edward Witten, theoretical physicist who works mainly in string theory
 Daniela Witten, American biostatistician and daughter of Edward Witten
 Matt Witten, screenwriter
 Jesse Witten, American tennis player
 Jason Witten, former American football player

See also
 Sergei Witte